Tia Hinds  (born 11 May 2002) is an Australian rugby union player.

Hinds was named in the Australia squad for the Rugby sevens at the 2020 Summer Olympics. The team came second in the pool round but then lost to Fiji 14-12 in the quarterfinals.

Hinds won a gold medal with the Australian sevens team at the 2022 Commonwealth Games in Birmingham. She was a member of the Australian team that won the 2022 Sevens Rugby World Cup held in Cape Town, South Africa in September 2022.

References 

2002 births
Living people
Australian female rugby union players
Australian female rugby sevens players
Olympic rugby sevens players of Australia
Rugby sevens players at the 2020 Summer Olympics
21st-century Australian women
Rugby sevens players at the 2022 Commonwealth Games
Medallists at the 2022 Commonwealth Games
Commonwealth Games gold medallists for Australia
Commonwealth Games medallists in rugby sevens